Phosphatidylinositol 3-kinase regulatory subunit alpha is an enzyme that in humans is encoded by the PIK3R1 gene.

Function 

Phosphatidylinositol 3-kinase phosphorylates the inositol ring of phosphatidylinositol at the 3-prime position. The enzyme comprises a 110 kD catalytic subunit and a regulatory subunit of either 85, 55, or 50 kD. This gene encodes the 85 kD regulatory subunit. Phosphatidylinositol 3-kinase plays an important role in the metabolic actions of insulin, and a mutation in this gene has been associated with insulin resistance. Alternative splicing of this gene results in three transcript variants encoding different isoforms.

Clinical significance 

Mutations in PIK3R1 are implicated in cases of breast cancer.

Mutations in PIK3R1 are associated to SHORT syndrome.

Interactions 

PIK3R1 has been shown to interact with:

 ADAM12, 
 BCAR1, 
 CBLB, 
 CD117, 
 CD28, 
 CD7, 
 CENTG1,
 CBL, 
 EPHA2, 
 EPOR, 
 ERBB3, 
 EZR, 
 FCGR2A, 
 GAB1, 
 GAB2, 
 Grb2, 
 HRAS, 
 IRS1 
 IRS2, 
 IL1R1, 
 JAK2, 
 KHDRBS1, 
 LTK, 
 LAT, 
 LCP2, 
 PIK3CD, 
 PTK2, 
 SHB, 
 TUBA1B, 
 TYRO3, 
 VAV1, and
 WAS.

References

Further reading